Velyki Kopani, also known as Bolshie Kopani is a village (selo) in southern Ukraine, located in Kherson Raion, Kherson Oblast. It has a population of 5654 people. It is located 44 km from the city of Kherson.

History 
As of 1886, 3990 people lived in the area, and there was an Orthodox church in the village, a school, 5 benches, and two fairs every year.

21st century 

During the COVID-19 pandemic, the Nezhdana market was closed due to safety concerns.

During the 2022 Russian invasion of Ukraine, it has been occupied by the Russian Armed Forces.

Economy 
The Nezhdana market in Velyki Kopani is the largest wholesale market in southern Ukraine.

Demographics 
According to the 1989 Ukrainian census, 4640 people lived in the village, of whom 2087 were men and 2553 were women.

By 2001, the population had increased to 5675. According to the 2001 Ukrainian census, the native languages of the population of the city were:

Notable people 
 Pavlo Shushko (born 2000), footballer

References 

Villages in Kherson Raion